Theophilus Van Kannel (1841 – December 24, 1919) was an American inventor, known for inventing the revolving door, patented on August 7, 1888.

Biography
He was born in Philadelphia, Pennsylvania, USA. Van Kannel, who was recognized for his invention with the John Scott Medal by the Franklin Institute in 1889, founded the Van Kannel Revolving Door Company, which eventually was bought out by the International Steel Company in 1907.  International Steel Company is the parent company of International Revolving Door Company.

He invented and owned  Witching Waves, an amusement ride introduced at Luna Park, Coney Island, in 1907.

Van Kannel died in New York City of heart failure and was buried in West Park Cemetery, Cleveland, Ohio.

References 

1841 births
1919 deaths
American inventors
American people of Swiss descent
People from Philadelphia
Burials in Ohio
Engineers from Pennsylvania